Academic ranks in the United States are the titles, relative importance and power of professors, researchers, and administrative personnel held in academia.

Professorship

Most common hierarchy 
For regular faculty (i.e., not counting administrative positions such as chairships or deanships, nor positions considered "staff" rather than faculty), the descending hierarchy in most cases is:

 Chair, Distinguished, Endowed or University Professor (Other such titles of special distinction vary by institution)
 Professor ("Full Professor", i.e., the destination of the "tenure track," upon exhausting all promotions other than those of special distinction)
 Associate Professor (A mid-level, usually tenured, faculty member)
 Assistant Professor (typically entry-level for "tenure track" positions which lead to Associate Professor)
 Research Associate, Lecturer, Instructor, Visiting Professor (usually non-tenure-track positions, sometimes with their own respective ranking hierarchies)

Somewhat outside the regular hierarchy:
 Adjunct Professor, Clinical Professor, Professor of Practice. People who have outside activities such as medical practice, professional engineer, lawyer and do not work full-time in a research capacity.
Research Professor. Is sometimes given to people who also work, in parallel, for a research institute not connected to a university or are faculty on a department performing only research, typically on grant-based "soft money".
In-Residence Titles. These include professor-in-residence, associate professor-in-residence, assistant professor-in-residence, instructor-in-residence, etc. In-residence titles are used for temporary, non-tenure track appointments paralleling regular faculty ranks. Faculty members in these titles may be asked to carry out all aspects of regular faculty roles, teaching, research and service, and must meet the same professional criteria as the tenure track faculty. At the end of their appointments, these faculty members may be reappointed, usually on an annual basis.

Background
Traditionally, Assistant Professor has been the usual entry-level rank for faculty on the "tenure track", although this depends on the institution and the field. Then, promotion to the rank of Associate Professor and later Professor (informally, "Full Professor") indicates that significant work has been done in research, teaching and institutional service. Although the associate rank usually indicates that a tenure-track professor has been granted tenure, some tenure-track personnel may be hired at the associate rank from another academic institution or a nonacademic profession contingent on the expectation that they will soon receive tenure. In rare instances, one may be tenured and remain at the assistant rank if promotion to the higher rank is not contingent on the bestowal of tenure. It typically takes about six years or so to advance in rank. The time for advancement between associate to full professor is less rigid than for assistant to associate. Typically, failure to be promoted to associate professor from assistant results in termination following a 1-year appointment. Although it can engender professional stigmatization, tenured faculty are usually permitted to remain in the associate grade indefinitely, with some institutions now conferring emeritus status at that rank.

In applied fields, such as engineering, law, medicine, business, or journalism – and lately expanding to others – faculty types can also include Clinical Professor or Professor of Practice. Often tied to secure, long-term contracts with significant review processes, these ranks are generally not tenure-track and emphasize practitioner knowledge and skills rather than scholarly research. Depending on the discipline and range of experience, incumbents in these positions may only possess an undergraduate degree or a secondary school diploma. A variant is the less-common title of Teaching Professor, which is not limited to professional fields. Recently, some institutions have created separate tenure tracks for such positions, which may also be given other names such as "lecturer with security of employment".

Other faculty who are not on the tenure track in the U.S. are often classified as Lecturers (or more advanced Senior Lecturers) or Instructors, who may teach full-time or have some administrative duties, but have no research obligations (essentially the converse of "research-only" faculty or "research-only staff", which has no true counterpart because teaching positions are almost always "faculty" – except for student-assistantships), which also come in various forms and may be either tenure-track or not.  Both Lecturers and Instructors typically hold advanced graduate/professional degrees. The term "professor" as a common noun is often used for persons holding any kind of faculty position. In academic medicine, Instructor usually denotes someone who has completed residency, fellowship, or other post-doctoral (M.D./D.O.) training but who is not tenure-track faculty.

Any faculty title preceded with the qualifier "Adjunct" normally denotes part-time status (usually less than half-time). Adjunct faculty may have primary employment elsewhere (either another school, or as a practicing professional), though in today's saturated academic market many doctorate-holders seek to earn a living from several adjunct jobs (to the advantage of institutions, which do not typically offer such faculty retirement/health benefits or long-term contracts). At some institutions, the job title Part-time Lecturer (PTL) is used instead.

Although "Professor" is often the highest rank attained by a senior faculty member, some institutions may offer a unique title to a senior faculty member whose research or publications have achieved wide recognition. This may be a "named professorship" or "named chair" – for example, the "John Doe Professor of Philosophy". Named chairs typically but not exclusively include a small discretionary fund from an endowment set aside for the recipient's use. Large research universities also offer a small fraction of tenured faculty the title of "Distinguished Professor", "Distinguished Teaching Professor", or "Distinguished Research Professor" to recognize outstanding contributions. Some universities have as their highest rank "University/Institute Professor"; such faculty members are not usually answerable to deans or department heads and may report directly to the university provost.

In research, faculty who direct a lab or research group may in certain research contexts (e.g., grant applications) be called Principal Investigator, or P.I., though this refers to their management role and is not usually thought of as an academic rank.

Excepting special ranks (such as endowed chairs), academic rank is dependent upon the promotion process of each college or university. Thus, a tenured associate professor at one institution might accept a "lower" position at another university (i.e., an assistant professorship) because of its connection to the "tenure track." In some cases, an assistant professor who accepts a position of similar rank at another university may negotiate "time towards tenure", which indicates a shorter required probationary period, usually in recognition of prior academic achievements.

Temporary faculty and special appointments

The ranks of lecturer and senior lecturer are used at some American universities to denote permanent teaching positions (full or part-time) with few or no research responsibilities.

Research personnel
Fellowships and Research scientist positions are most often limited-term appointments for postdoctoral researchers. They are not usually regarded as faculty positions, but rather staff, although some teaching may be involved (albeit usually not with ultimate course responsibility). A common list of such positions is as follows (many of which often entail various ranking systems – e.g. numbered ranks, adjectives like "intermediate" or "senior," etc.).
 Research Associate (general)
 Research Scientist (natural or social sciences)
 Research Engineer (engineering)
 Research Scholar (humanities)
 Research Technician (general)
 Research Assistant (general)
 Postdoctoral Fellow / Research Associate (general)

Teaching personnel
Teaching assistants (TAs) are known by various related terms and are typically graduate students who have varying levels of responsibility. A typical undergraduate class, for example, comprises lecture and small-group recitation/discussion sessions, with a faculty member giving the lecture, and TAs leading the small-group sessions; in other cases, the teaching of an entire class may be entrusted to a graduate student. (See generally A Handbook for Mathematics Teaching Assistants, published by the Mathematical Association of America.)

Ecclesiastical ranks 
Ecclesiastical seminaries and churches often grant the titles Doctor of Divinity (D.D.), Doctor of Metaphysics (Dr. mph.) or Doctor of Religious Science (Dr. sc. rel.), most commonly to meritorious clerics for an outstanding work or another achievement in the field of religious and biblical studies.

Other
At some universities, librarians have a rank structure parallel to that of tenure-track faculty (Assistant Librarian, Associate Librarian, Librarian). Some senior librarians, and often the head librarian, may have faculty or faculty-equivalent rank.

Administrative ranks

Officers of the corporation
 Chancellor or President 
 Provost (sometimes called "Chancellor", or "President" or "Warden")
 Vice Provost
 Associate Provost 
 Assistant Provost (assists the Provost, as do any associates; not superior to vice presidents)
 Vice-Chancellors or Vice Presidents (of Academic Affairs, Student Affairs, Finance, etc.)
 Associate Vice-Chancellor or Associate Vice President
 Assistant Vice-Chancellor or Assistant Vice President

Academic administrators
 Deans (often also Full Professors)
 Associate Deans (often also Full Professors )
 Assistant Dean (Usually Associate Professors)
 Directors of Administrative Departments
 Associate/Assistant Directors of Administrative Departments
 Chairs or Heads of Academic Departments

America's system of higher education is highly variable, with each of the 50 states and the 6 non-state jurisdictions regulating its own public tertiary institutions, and with each private institution developing its own structure. In general, the terms "President" and "Chancellor" are interchangeable (like "Premier" and "Prime Minister"), including the vice presidents, associate and assistant vice presidents, and so on. The dominant paradigm is president, vice president, associate vice president, and assistant vice president.

Some university systems or multi-campus universities use both titles, with one title for the chief executive of the entire system and the other for the chief executives of each campus.  Which title refers to which position can be highly variable from state to state or even within a state. In California, for example, the chief executive officer of the entire California State University system of 23 campuses is called "Chancellor" while the CEO of each individual campus is called "President" — thus, there is an officer called "Chancellor of the California State University", and there is the "President of San Francisco State University". In the University of California, by contrast, the terms are reversed — thus, there is the "President of the University of California", and below that person in the hierarchy is the "Chancellor of the University of California, Los Angeles", and so on.

The term 'Warden' is almost never used in the United States in an academic sense. Where it is used, it typically means "provost" or "dean".

Deans may head an individual college, school or faculty; or they may be deans of the student body, or a section of it (e.g., the dean of students in a law school); or they may be deans of a particular functional unit (e.g., Dean of Admissions, or Dean of Records); or they may be deans of a particular campus, or (unusually) of a particular building (e.g., a university with an elaborate performing arts complex might designate a very senior administrative faculty member as "Dean of the [Name] Performing Arts Center".

Academic department heads and chairs serve the same function, and there may also be associate and assistant department heads or chairs (though this is unusual). In medical schools, departments may be divided into sections or divisions by subspecialty, each with its own section chief or division chief.

See also
 Academic ranks in Canada
 Lecturer#United States
 List of academic ranks
 Teaching fellow#United States

References

External links
 "Handbook of Faculty Titles", by Michael I. Shamos, Ph.D., J.D., Carnegie Mellon University

Academic ranks
Education in the United States
Ranks